The team dressage in equestrian at the 1948 Olympic Games in London was held in the town of Aldershot on 9 August. The French team consisting of André Jousseaume, Jean Saint-Fort Paillard and Maurice Buret won the gold medal. The United States won silver and Portugal took bronze.

Competition format
The team and individual dressage competitions used the same results. A test was to be carried out from memory by each rider within 13 minutes, losing half a point for every second over the time limit.

Results

References

Equestrian at the Summer Olympics